Elizaveta Stekolnikova (born April 20, 1974) is a former ice dancer who competed internationally for Kazakhstan. With partner Dmitri Kazarlyga, she is the 1994 Skate America bronze medalist, 1995 Winter Universiade bronze medalist, and 1996 Asian Winter Games champion. They placed 18th at the 1994 Winter Olympics and 22nd at the 1998 Winter Olympics.

Stekolnikova teamed up with Kazarlyga in Moscow and trained with him in the United States under Natalia Dubova. Their partnership ended in 1998.

Stekolnikova teamed up with American skater Mark Fitzgerald for one season. They competed at both the Four Continents and the World Championships. After retiring from competition, she began working as a coach in Ontario, Canada.

Results
GP: Champions Series (Grand Prix)

With Kazarlyga

With Fitzgerald

References

 Skatabase: 1990s Olympics Ice Dancing Results

External links
 Icedance.com profile

1974 births
Living people
Figure skaters from Moscow
Kazakhstani female ice dancers
Figure skaters at the 1998 Winter Olympics
Figure skaters at the 1994 Winter Olympics
Olympic figure skaters of Kazakhstan
Asian Games medalists in figure skating
Figure skaters at the 1996 Asian Winter Games
Medalists at the 1996 Asian Winter Games
Asian Games gold medalists for Kazakhstan
Universiade medalists in figure skating
Universiade bronze medalists for Kazakhstan
Competitors at the 1995 Winter Universiade